Hugo Carlos Rodrigues Ganchinho Pereira (born 6 November 1978), is a Portuguese football coach and former player. He is currently head coach for Ranheim. He was also assistant manager of Kåre Ingebrigtsen at Rosenborg along with Erik Hoftun. During his period at the club, Pereira contributed to two Norwegian league titles, two Norwegian super cup and one Norwegian cup.

Biography
Hugo Pereira was a youth player at Benfica but never managed to take the step up to professional football. After playing amateur football for about 10 years, Pereira retired and instead started pursuing a career as a football manager. Pereira has a master's degree in education and a post-graduation in high performance football coaching from the University of Lisbon. In 2012, Pereira became the assistant manager and academy director of Follo. Due to the club struggling with finances, Pereira stepped down after the season to spare the club money. In 2013, he left for Rosenborg to enter the position of a player developer at the Rosenborg academy. In January 2017 he became the assistant manager of Kåre Ingebrigtsen at Rosenborg alongside Erik Hoftun.

In January 2017, Pereira was chosen as one of two to spend a week with José Mourinho at Manchester United. This came to be through the High Performance Football Coaching course at the University of Lisbon where Mourinho would choose the two that impressed the most. From among several other contenders coincidence had it that the other one chosen to visit José Mourinho was Norwegian Martin Reier, former Follo player at the time Pereira was at Follo who had also attended the course.

Managerial statistics 
As of 11 July 2022

References

1978 births
Living people
Association football forwards
Portuguese footballers
C.D. Montijo players
Juventude Sport Clube players
Amora F.C. players
AD Oeiras players
Portuguese football managers
Rosenborg BK non-playing staff
Ranheim Fotball managers
Portuguese expatriate football managers
Expatriate football managers in Norway
Portuguese expatriate sportspeople in Norway
Expatriate football managers in Colombia
Portuguese expatriate sportspeople in Colombia